Gerhard Pusnik (born 16 October 1966) is an Austrian ice hockey player. He competed in the men's tournaments at the 1988 Winter Olympics, the 1994 Winter Olympics and the 1998 Winter Olympics.

Career statistics

Regular season and playoffs

International

References

1966 births
Living people
Olympic ice hockey players of Austria
Ice hockey players at the 1988 Winter Olympics
Ice hockey players at the 1994 Winter Olympics
Ice hockey players at the 1998 Winter Olympics
People from Feldkirch, Vorarlberg
Sportspeople from Vorarlberg